These 357 genera belong to Ichneumonini, a tribe of ichneumon wasps in the family Ichneumonidae.

Ichneumonini genera

 Acanthobenyllus Heinrich, 1938
 Achaius Cameron, 1903
 Achaiusoides Tereshkin, 2011
 Acolobus Wesmael, 1845
 Aculichneumon Heinrich, 1937
 Aculicoxa Gauld, 1984
 Adelotropis Waterston, 1921
 Aeneonaenaria Heinrich, 1974
 Aethiamblys Heinrich, 1967
 Aethianoplis Heinrich, 1969
 Aethioplites Heinrich, 1938
 Aethioplitops Heinrich, 1969
 Afrobystra Heinrich, 1969
 Afrocoelichneumon Heinrich, 1938
 Afrolongichneumon Heinrich, 1969
 Afromelanichneumon Heinrich, 1938
 Afromevesia Roman, 1924
 Afrotrogus Heinrich, 1938
 Aglaojoppa Cameron, 1901
 Algathia Cameron, 1902
 Allonotus Cameron, 1907
 Alystria Cameron, 1904
 Amblyaeneus Heinrich, 1965
 Amblyjoppa Cameron, 1902
 Amblysmenus Heinrich, 1975
 Amblyteles Wesmael, 1845
 Anisobas Wesmael, 1845
 Anisopygus Kriechbaumer, 1888
 Aoplus Tischbein, 1874
 Apatetor Saussure, 1890
 Apatetorides Heinrich, 1938
 Archboldiella Heinrich, 1934
 Atanyjoppa Cameron, 1901
 Auberteterus Diller, 1981
 Aucklandella Cameron, 1909
 Aulojoppa Cameron, 1907
 Auritus Constantineanu, 1969
 Bambuscopus Heinrich, 1934
 Baranisobas Heinrich, 1972
 Barichneumon Thomson, 1893
 Barichneumonites Heinrich, 1934
 Benyllus Cameron, 1903
 Bonthainiella Heinrich, 1934
 Bovijoppa Heinrich, 1965
 Bureschias Heinrich, 1936
 Bystra Cameron, 1902
 Callajoppa Cameron, 1903
 Calleupalamus Heinrich, 1938
 Carinodes Hancock, 1926
 Catadelphops Heinrich, 1962
 Catadelphus Wesmael, 1854
 Celebarches Heinrich, 1934
 Celebichneumon Heinrich, 1934
 Celebijoppa Heinrich, 1934
 Centeterichneumon Heinrich, 1938
 Ceratojoppa Cameron, 1905
 Cesandria Koçak, 2009
 Charmedia Wahl & Sime, 2002
 Chasmias Ashmead, 1900
 Chasmopygium Heinrich, 1967
 Chiaglas Cameron, 1902
 Clitiga Cameron, 1905
 Clypeocava Heinrich, 1934
 Clypeodromus Tereshkin, 1992
 Cnemojoppa Cameron, 1907
 Cobunus Uchida, 1926
 Coelapatetor Heinrich, 1967
 Coelichneumon Thomson, 1893
 Coelichneumonops Heinrich, 1958
 Coelojoppa Cameron, 1904
 Coeloleptops Heinrich, 1967
 Compsophorus Saussure, 1890
 Conocalama Hopper, 1939
 Conopyge Kreichbaumer, 1898
 Cornuprocerus Diller, 1981
 Cornutoplisus Heinrich, 1957
 Corymbichneumon Morley, 1919
 Cosmiojoppa Cameron, 1902
 Crathiorada Heinrich, 1965
 Cratichneumon Thomson, 1893
 Cratojoppa Cameron, 1901
 Crypteffigies Heinrich, 1961
 Cryptojoppa Kriechbaumer, 1898
 Cryptoplites Heinrich, 1938
 Crytea Cameron, 1906
 Ctenichneumon Thomson, 1894
 Ctenichneumonops Heinrich, 1968
 Ctenocalops Heinrich, 1967
 Ctenocalus Szépligeti, 1908
 Ctenochares Förster, 1869
 Cushmaniella Heinrich, 1934
 Daggoo Wahl & Sime, 2002
 Dammermaniella Heinrich, 1934
 Dammermaniellops Heinrich, 1974
 Darachosia Cameron, 1903
 Darymna Cameron, 1904
 Degithina Cameron, 1900
 Deniya Cameron, 1905
 Dentichasmias Heinrich, 1969
 Dentichasmiops Heinrich, 1969
 Denticrytea Heinrich, 1969
 Depressopyga Heinrich, 1969
 Deuterolabops Heinrich, 1975
 Deuterotypus Heinrich, 1930
 Diacantharius Schmiedeknecht, 1902
 Diaschisaspis Förster, 1869
 Diashisaspis 
 Dicaelognathus Gokhman, 1990
 Dilleria Tereshkin, 1994
 Dilopharius Townes, 1966
 Dimaetha Cameron, 1901
 Diphyus Kriechbaumer, 1890
 Dothenia Wahl & Sime, 2002
 Eccoptosage Kriechbaumer, 1898
 Ectopimorpha Viereck, 1912
 Eleebichneumon Gauld, 1984
 Elysioreiga Heinrich, 1965
 Eristicus Wesmael, 1845
 Euheresiarches Heinrich, 1934
 Eupalamus Wesmael, 1845
 Eurydacus Townes, 1966
 Eutanyacra Cameron, 1903
 Evirchomella Heinrich, 1969
 Exephanes Wesmael, 1845
 Facydes Cameron, 1901
 Fileanta Cameron, 1901
 Foveosculum Heinrich, 1938
 Gareila Heinrich, 1980
 Gathetus Cameron, 1901
 Gavrana Cameron, 1906
 Genaemirum Heinrich, 1936
 Gibbobystra Heinrich, 1969
 Gibbosoplites 
 Gnamptopelta Hopper, 1939
 Goedartia Boie, 1841
 Gyrodonta Cameron, 1901
 Gyrodontichneumon Heinrich, 1965
 Hedyjoppa Cameron, 1904
 Hemibystra Heinrich, 1969
 Hemibystrops Heinrich, 1969
 Hemihoplis Heinrich, 1960
 Hemiphaisura Heinrich, 1967
 Hepialichneumon Dong, Wang, Yang, Yang & Shen, 1993
 Hepiopelmus Wesmael, 1845
 Heresiarches Wesmael, 1859
 Hintelmannia Diller & Schonitzer, 1997
 Hiorada Cameron, 1902
 Holcichneumon Cameron, 1911
 Holcojoppa Cameron, 1902
 Holojoppa Szépligeti, 1900
 Homotherus Förster, 1869
 Hoplismenus Gravenhorst, 1829
 Humbert Wahl & Sime, 2002
 Hybophorellus Schultz, 1911
 Hymenura Townes, 1965
 Hytophatnus Cameron, 1907
 Ichneumon Linnæus, 1758
 Ileanta Cameron, 1899
 Ileantella Heinrich, 1968
 Imeria R. M. King & H. Rob.
 Ischnojoppa Kriechbaumer, 1898
 Jacotitypus Heinrich, 1967
 Joppa Fabricius, 1804
 Joppocryptus Viereck, 1913
 Lachmetha Cameron, 1903
 Laderrica Wahl & Sime, 2002
 Lagavula Wahl & Sime, 2002
 Lareiga Cameron, 1903
 Larischia Heinrich, 1969
 Legnatia Cameron, 1903
 Leptojoppa Cameron, 1901
 Leptomalaisia Heinrich, 1965
 Leptophatnus Cameron, 1906
 Leptops Schoenherr, C.J., 1834
 Leptotogea Heinrich, 1969
 Liaodontus Diller, 1994
 Lichmeres Townes, 1946
 Limerodes Wesmael, 1845
 Limerodops Heinrich, 1949
 Limonethe Townes, 1946
 Liojoppa Szépligeti, 1908
 Liojoppites Heinrich, 1967
 Lissolongichneumon Heinrich, 1969
 Lissophadnus Cameron, 1907
 Lissosculpta Heinrich, 1934
 Listrodromus Wesmael, 1845
 Lobaegis Townes, 1946
 Londokia 
 Longichneumon Heinrich, 1934
 Lophojoppa Brèthes, 1927
 Losgna Cameron, 1903
 Luteocoelius Heinrich, 1968
 Lymantrichneumon Heinrich, 1968
 Lynteria Cameron, 1904
 Macrojoppa Kriechbaumer, 1898
 Madagasgavrana Heinrich, 1938
 Madagasichneumon Heinrich, 1938
 Magwengiella Bachmaier & Diller, 1985
 Malaisichneumon Heinrich, 1965
 Maraces Cameron, 1902
 Marlisia Heinrich, 1975
 Matara Holmgren, 1868
 Matinangarches Heinrich, 1934
 Megajoppa Szépligeti, 1900
 Melanichneumon Thomson, 1893
 Menkokia Heinrich, 1934
 Merolides Brèthes, 1909
 Mesophadnus Cameron, 1907
 Metallichneumon Wahl & Sime, 2002
 Micrandria Heinrich, 1934
 Microlongichneumon Heinrich, 1969
 Microsage Kriechbaumer, 1898
 Mokajoppa Wahl & Sime, 2002
 Monodontichneumon Heinrich, 1969
 Monontos Uchida, 1926
 Myocious Wahl & Sime, 2002
 Naenaria Cameron, 1903
 Naenarides Heinrich, 1969
 Naenarosculum Heinrich, 1968
 Narthecura Townes, 1946
 Neamblyaeneus Heinrich, 1965
 Neamblymorpha Heinrich, 1960
 Neischnus Heinrich, 1952
 Neocratojoppa Heinrich, 1969
 Neodiphyus Heinrich, 1977
 Neofacydes Heinrich, 1960
 Neoheresiarches Uchida, 1937
 Neolareiga Heinrich, 1980
 Neotypus Förster, 1869
 Nesostenodontus Cushman, 1922
 Netanyacra Heinrich, 1968
 Nonpropodeum Heinrich, 1934
 Notacma Townes, 1946
 Obtusodonta Heinrich, 1962
 Odontojoppa Cameron, 1903
 Oedicephalus Cresson, 1868
 Oezdemirus Özdikmen & Turgut, 2006
 Ogulnia Cameron, 1904
 Oreohoplis Townes, 1966
 Orgichneumon Heinrich, 1961
 Oriphatnus Heinrich, 1967
 Orotylus Holmgren, 1890
 Ortezia Cresson, 1873
 Paracoelichneumon Heinrich, 1978
 Paraditremops Heinrich, 1977
 Paraethecerus Bruch, 1926
 Parvaoplus Heinrich, 1969
 Patrocloides Heinrich, 1961
 Patroclus Cresson, 1873
 Pectinorex Graf, 1976
 Pedinopelte Kriechbaumer, 1898
 Pentelophus Townes, 1966
 Pepsijoppa Heinrich, 1936
 Phaeneumon Gauld, 1984
 Phaisura Cameron, 1906
 Phaisurella Heinrich, 1938
 Phaisurellops Heinrich, 1967
 Pithotomus Kriechbaumer, 1888
 Plagiotrypes Ashmead, 1900
 Platyjoppa Uchida, 1932
 Platylabops Heinrich, 1950
 Poecilodromops Heinrich, 1975
 Poecilodromus Heinrich, 1975
 Poecilojoppa Kriechbaumer, 1898
 Poecilojoppoides Heinrich, 1934
 Procerochasmias Heinrich, 1938
 Projoppa Townes, 1936
 Protichneumon Thomson, 1893
 Protoleptops Heinrich, 1967
 Protopelmus Heinrich, 1959
 Provancherides Heinrich, 1968
 Pseudalomya Telenga, 1930
 Pseudeupalamus Heinrich, 1980
 Pseudevirchoma Heinrich, 1969
 Pseudischnojoppa Heinrich, 1967
 Pseudoamblyteles Heinrich, 1926
 Pseudocillimops Heinrich, 1969
 Pseudocillimus Roman, 1920
 Pseudocoelichneumon Heinrich, 1967
 Pseudomaraces Heinrich, 1975
 Pseudoplatylabops Heinrich, 1967
 Pseudoplatylabus Smits van Burgst, 1920
 Pseudotogea Heinrich, 1969
 Psilomastax Tischbein, 1868
 Punctileptops Heinrich, 1967
 Pyramidamblys Heinrich, 1967
 Quandrus Wahl & Sime, 2002
 Queequeg Wahl & Sime, 2002
 Raninia Diller, 1985
 Rhadinodonta Szépligeti, 1908
 Rhadinodontoplisus Heinrich, 1938
 Rhadinodontops Heinrich, 1969
 Rhysaspis Tischbein, 1874
 Rictichneumon Heinrich, 1961
 Rimbusia Heinrich, 1980
 Rubicundiella Heinrich, 1961
 Rugosculpta Heinrich, 1968
 Saltagenes Diller, 1995
 Saranaca Wahl & Sime, 2002
 Satrius Tosquinet, 1903
 Semitogea Heinrich, 1969
 Serratosculum Heinrich, 1969
 Setanta Cameron, 1901
 Setantops Heinrich, 1969
 Seyrighoplites Heinrich, 1938
 Seyrigichneumon Heinrich, 1938
 Seyrigiella Heinrich, 1938
 Solitosculum Heinrich, 1968
 Spilichneumon Thomson, 1894
 Spilothyrateles Heinrich, 1967
 Spinallonotus Heinrich, 1967
 Spinamblys Heinrich, 1969
 Spinellamblys Heinrich, 1969
 Stenaoplus Heinrich, 1938
 Stenapatetor Heinrich, 1938
 Stenarches Heinrich, 1934
 Stenarchops Heinrich, 1968
 Stenichneumon Thomson, 1893
 Stenichneumonopsis Heinrich, 1934
 Stenobarichneumon Heinrich, 1961
 Stenobenyllus Heinrich, 1938
 Stenogynaia Heinrich, 1965
 Stenolonche Kriechbaumer, 1898
 Stirexephanes Cameron, 1912
 Stirojoppa Cameron, 1911
 Sycaonia Cameron, 1903
 Syspasis Townes, 1965
 Tashtego Wahl & Sime, 2002
 Tetragonochora Kriechbaumer, 1898
 Thascia Cameron, 1904
 Thaumatocephalus Heinrich, 1930
 Thaumatoplites Heinrich, 1969
 Thaumatoplitops Heinrich, 1969
 Thymebatis Brèthes, 1909
 Thyrateles Perkins, 1953
 Thyridoplites Heinrich, 1969
 Tmetogaster Hopper, 1939
 Togea Uchida, 1926
 Togeella Heinrich, 1980
 Torquaoplus Heinrich, 1969
 Tricholabus Thomson, 1894
 Tricyphus Kriechbaumer, 1898
 Triptognathops Heinrich, 1978
 Triptognathus Berthoumieu, 1904
 Trogichneumon Heinrich, 1968
 Trogomorpha Ashmead, 1900
 Trogopyga Heinrich, 1969
 Trogus Panzer, 1806
 Ulesta Cameron, 1903
 Uloola Gauld, 1984
 Validentia Heinrich, 1934
 Virgichneumon Heinrich, 1977
 Vulgichneumon Heinrich, 1961
 Xanthosomnium Wahl & Sime, 2002
 Xestojoppa Cameron, 1901
 Yeppoona Gauld, 1984
 Zanthojoppa Cameron, 1901

References